The 2007 Speedway Grand Prix of Slovenia was the tenth race of the 2007 Speedway Grand Prix season. It took place on 22 September in the Matija Gubec Stadium in Krško, Slovenia.

Starting positions draw 

(1) Jason Crump (Australia)
(11) Scott Nicholls (United Kingdom)
(9) Jarosław Hampel (Poland)
(4) Andreas Jonsson (Sweden)
(15) Chris Harris (United Kingdom)
(16) Jurica Pavlič (Croatia)
(6) Hans N. Andersen (Denmark)
(10) Antonio Lindbäck (Sweden)
(12) Bjarne Pedersen (Denmark)
(5 Leigh Adams (Australia)
(8) Tomasz Gollob (Poland))
(2) Greg Hancock (United States)
(14) Rune Holta (Poland)
(3) Nicki Pedersen (Denmark)
(13) Wiesław Jaguś (Poland)
(7) Matej Žagar (Slovenia)
(17) Jernej Kolenko (Slovenia)
(18) Izak Šantej (Slovenia)

Heat details

Heat after heat 
 Crump, Nicholls, Jonsson, Hampel
 Harris, Pavlič, Anderseon, Lindbäck
 Adams, Gollob, Hancock, B.Pedersen
 N.Pedersen, Holta, Jaguś, Žagar (E/start)
 Holta, Crump, Harris, B.Pedersen
 Adams, N.Pedersen, Nicholls, Pavlič
 Jaguś, Gollob, Hampel, Andersen
 Jonsson, Hancock, Žagar, Lindbäck
 Žagar, Gollob, Crump, Pavlič
 Jaguś, Nicholls, Hancock, Harris
 N.Pedersen, B.Pedersen, Lindbäck, Hampel
 Holta, Jonsson, Adams, Andersen (F)
 N.Pedersen, Andersen, Crump, Hancock
 Nicholls, Holta, Gollob, Lindbäck
 Harris, Hampel, Žagar, Adams
 B.Pedersen, Pavlič, Jaguś, Jonsson
 Crump, Adams, Jaguś, Lindbäck
 B.Pedersen, Nicholls, Žagar, Andersen (E4)
 Hampel, Holta, Pavlič, Hancock
 N.Pedersen, Gollob, Harris, Jonsson Semi-Finals:
 N.Pedersen, Nicholls, Gollob, Jaguś
 Crump, Holta, B.Pedersen, Adams Finał:
 N.Pedersen (6), Nicholls (4), Holta (2) Crump (0)

The intermediate classification

See also 
List of Speedway Grand Prix riders

References 

Sl
2007
2007 in Slovenian sport